Jilore is a settlement in Kenya's Kilifi County. Once a settlement that thrived in 1800s with traders in grain and locksmiths, it grew it Christian mission in 1881. Upon the arrival of DAL Hooper, the Cambridge educated missionary, Jilore become a religious center.

References 

Populated places in Coast Province
Kilifi County